The 1937 Ole Miss Rebels football team was an American football team that represented the University of Mississippi in the Southeastern Conference during the 1937 college football season. In its eighth season under head coach Ed Walker, the team compiled a 4–5–1 record (0–4 against conference opponents) and outscored opponents by a total of 127 to 106.  The team played its home games at Hemingway Stadium in Oxford, Mississippi.

Schedule

References

Ole Miss
Ole Miss Rebels football seasons
Ole Miss Rebels football